Gary E. Collins (born September 19, 1942) is an American politician who served as a member of the Idaho House of Representatives from 2000 to 2020.

Education
Collins graduated from Kuna High School.

Elections

Idaho House of Representatives District 13 Seat B

2018 
Collins defeated Lori Shewmaker in the Republican primary with 62.2% of the vote. Collins defeated Democratic nominee Chris Ho with 65.8% of the vote.

2016 
Collins defeated Alan C. Jones again in the Republican primary this time with 70.9% of the vote. Collins was unopposed in the general election.

2014 
Collins defeated Alan C. Jones in the Republican primary with 73.1% of the vote. Collins was unopposed in the general election.

2012 
Redistricted to District 13, and with Representative Christy Perry re-districted to District 11, Collins was unopposed for the May 15, 2012, Republican primary, and unopposed for the general election on November 6, 2012.

Idaho House of Representatives District 12 Seat B

2010 
Collins won the May 25, 2010, Republican primary with 2,807 votes (75.2%) against Greg Collett, and won the November 2, 2010, general election with 5,970 votes (72.2%) against Melissa Sue Robinson (D).

2008 
Unopposed for the May 27, 2008, Republican primary, Collins won with 2,086 votes; Freeman had been unopposed for the Democratic primary, setting up a rematch. Collins won the November 4, 2006, general election with 8,352 votes (65.5%) against Freeman.

2006 
Unopposed for the May 23, 2006, Republican primary, Collins won with 2,435 votes, and won the November 7, 2006, general election with 5,781 votes (68.39%) against Sunny Freeman (D).

2004 
Unopposed for the May 25, 2004, Republican primary, Collins won with 2,425 votes, and won the November 2, 2004, general election with 8,614 votes (69.5%) against Ralph Smith (D).

2002 
Redistricted to 12B, and with Republican Representative W.W. 'Bill' Deal re-districted to 13B, Collins was unopposed for the May 28, 2002, Republican primary, winning with 2,279 votes, and won the November 5, 2002, general election with 5,331 votes (65.1%) against Amanda Brown (D).

Idaho House of Representatives District 11 Seat B

2000 
When Republican Representative W.O. Taylor left the District 11 B seat open, Collins won the May 23, 2000, Republican primary with 2,821 votes (54.3%) against Curtis McKenzie, and won the November 7, 2000, general election with 11,340 votes (74.1%) against Democratic nominee Benny Antunes (D).

References

External links
Gary E. Collins Idaho Legislature
 
 Biography at Ballotpedia
 Financial information (state office) at the National Institute for Money in State]

1942 births
Living people
Republican Party members of the Idaho House of Representatives
People from Boise, Idaho
People from Nampa, Idaho
21st-century American politicians